Your Move is an album by America.

Your Move may also refer to:

 "Your Move" (song), title track from the album
 "Your Move", the first part of the song "I've Seen All Good People" by Yes
 Your Move, a UK estate agent, part of Lending Solutions

See also
 It's Your Move (disambiguation)